A Piece of Sky may refer to:

 A Piece of Sky (1980 film), a Soviet Armenian film
 A Piece of Sky (2002 film), a French-Belgian film
 A Piece of Sky (2022 film), a Swiss-German film by Michael Koch
 "A Piece of Sky", a song from the musical Yentl, written by Michel Legrand with lyrics by Alan and Marilyn Bergman